Ticotin is a surname. Notable people with the surname include: 

 Daniel Ticotin (born 1969), American musician, known as Sahaj (musician)
 Rachel Ticotin (born 1958), American actress